Fletchervirus is a genus of virus of the subfamily Eucampyvirinae and the phylum Uroviricota (Bacteriophage). This genus contains 5 different species. The family Myoviridae that this genus is a part of is identified from other bacteriophage species by its choice of host, bacteria of the genus Campylobacter. Fletchervirus like most bacteriophage are harmless to humans and thus have no antiviral drugs associated with them. They can be found worldwide and just like most bacteriophage species are found in almost all ecological environments including humans.

Comparative morphology 
Fletchervirus differs from its sibling (Firehammervirus) genus morphologically. Members of the genus have heads with a larger diameter and tails that are far shorter. For example, the species Campylobacter virus CP81 in the Fletchervirus genus has a head with 96 nm diameter, and a 97 nm long tail, whereas Campylobacter virus CP220 in the Firehammervirus genus has a head with a 93 nm diameter and a 140 nm long tail.

Genetically, members of Fletchervirus have a smaller genome that codes for less proteins, they dsDNA is also permuted circularly. Whereas, members of Firehammervirus have a larger genome with more proteins and a liner permuted dsDNA complex. For example, Campylobacter virus CP81 has a genome of 132 kb that codes for 149 proteins versus Campylobacter virus CP220 that has a genome 197 kb that codes for 257 proteins.

Host and phage therapy 
Campylobacter is a genus of Gram-negative bacteria. It is found mostly in raw meats, and if consumed can be a terrible pathogen for humans often causing diarrhea, cramps, fever and pain. Bacteriophage therapy is a growing research field, particularly in many species of Campylobacter. Members of the Fletchervirus have been specifically and promisingly tested for medical use to fight strands of antibiotic resistant Campylobacter.

Taxonomy 
Parent subfamily:

Eucampyvirinae

Child species:
 Campylobacter virus CP81
 Campylobacter virus CP30A
 Campylobacter virus CPX
 Campylobacter virus Los1
 Campylobacter virus NCTC12673

Sibling genus:

Firehammervirus

Nibling species:
 Campylobacter virus CP21
 Campylobacter virus CP220
 Campylobacter virus CPt10
 Campylobacter virus IBB35

References 

Myoviridae
Campylobacterota
Virus genera